Novaya Mikhaylovka is a rural locality (a selo) in Zonalny Selsoviet, Zonalny District, Altai Krai, Russia. The population was 304 as of 2013. There are 4 streets.

Geography 
Novaya Mikhaylovka is located on the Biysko-Chumyshskaya plain, 6 km west of Zonalnoye (the district's administrative centre) by road. Zonalnoye is the nearest rural locality.

References 

Rural localities in Zonalny District